Wind power is a major source of electricity in Portugal. At the end of 2020, wind power capacity in Continental Portugal was 5,456 MW. In 2020, wind power represented 23.7% of total electricity generation.

The record of wind power generation was achieved on November 22, 2019 with 103.1 GWh produced

Regional trends

Most of the Portuguese wind capacity is located in the north-northeast distritos. 
Viseu is the distrito with the largest installed capacity, followed by Coimbra, Vila Real and Castelo Branco.

Major wind farms
The 240 MW Alto Minho Wind Farm in the Viana do Castelo district became fully operational in November, 2008 when Portugal's Economy Minister Manuel Pinho inaugurated it. At the time of completion it was Europe's largest on-shore wind farm. 
The wind farm began generating electricity in 2007, with production increasing as more wind turbines came online, reflecting the modular nature of wind farms. The wind farm consists of 68 Enercon E-82 2MW wind turbines and 52 Enercon E-70 E4 2MW turbines, totaling 136 MW and 104 MW, respectively. The wind farm will produce 552 GWh annually, avoiding 370,000 tonnes of carbon dioxide emissions.

Other major wind farms include: Arada-Montemuro Wind Farm (112 MW), Gardunha Wind Farm (106 MW),  Pinhal Interior Wind Farm (144 MW), Ventominho Wind Farm (240 MW).

Other wind farms include: The Pampilhosa Wind Farm (114 MW) that uses Vestas V90 turbines; The Caramulo Wind Farm with a capacity of 90 MW, using Enercon E-70 E4 and E82/2000 turbines; and the Candeeiros Wind Farm with a capacity of 111 MW, using Vestas V90 turbines.

Portugal also has 2 MW of offshore capacity in the floating wind turbine WindFloat near the Aguçadoura Wave Farm in Póvoa de Varzim. It achieved successful testing, and it was transferred to Viana do Castelo in 2016 with planned expansion and renamed Windfloat Atlantic, and the Póvoa de Varzim site will foster a new technology.

In 2013, Portugal installed 196 MW of wind power. In 2015, the MW of wind power didn't change in comparison with 2014, remaining at 4922,88 MW.

At the end of 2020, wind power capacity in Continental Portugal was 5,456 MW.

See also

List of large wind farms
Renewable energy in the European Union
Renewable energy in Portugal
Solar power in Portugal
Geothermal power in Portugal
Renewable energy by country
Renewable energy commercialization

References

External links

Renewable Energy in Portugal

 
Portugal